Spilarctia todara is a moth of the family Erebidae. It was described by Frederic Moore in 1872. It is found in eastern India.

References

todara
Moths described in 1872